Tradition is the third studio album by American heavy metal musician Michael Angelo Batio. Recorded at Monster Mix Studio in Chicago, Illinois, it was released in 1998 by his own label M.A.C.E. Music as a companion to the video release Jam with Angelo. Batio performed all instruments on the release, as well as producing, engineering and mixing the album.

Background and production
Michael Angelo Batio's third solo album, Tradition, was recorded and mixed at Monster Mix Studio in his hometown Chicago, with Batio handling all production, engineering and mixing, and performing all instruments. The album was mastered at Kingsize Sound Laboratories. The final five tracks on the album are backing tracks without lead guitar.

Reception and legacy
Guitar Nine Records highlighted several songs on Tradition: on "China", Batio was praised for "making the unbelievable [guitar] passages seen easy and effortless", "Voices of the Distant Past" was described as a "progressive rock masterpiece with ... some of the most complex mixed meter passages that have been written", and "Prog" was noted to feature "one of the "coolest" grooves and melodies that Michael has written".

Five of the seven main songs on the album were later remastered for inclusion on the 2004 compilation album Lucid Intervals and Moments of Clarity Part 2 – "China", "The Finish Line", "Prog", "Video Jam" and "Prog Revisited".

A number of songs were also included on Batio's instructional video releases: "China" and "The Finish Line" on Performance, "Prog" on Speed Kills 3, and "The Finish Line" on Speed Lives 3: The Neo Classical Zone.

Track listing

Personnel
Personnel credits adapted from the album's booklet.
Michael Angelo Batio – guitars, other instruments, arrangements, production, engineering, mixing
Dan Machnik – photography

References

1998 albums
Michael Angelo Batio albums
M.A.C.E. Music albums